Wogeo (Vokeo) is an Austronesian language of northeast New Guinea. It is spoken on Koil and Vokeo islands of Wewak Islands Rural LLG.

References

External links 
 Word lists for Wogeo included in the Robert Blust collection in the Kaipuleohone archive

Schouten languages
Languages of East Sepik Province